Thomas Dudley Price (17 November 1931 – 2021), also known as Duggie Price, was a Welsh professional footballer who played as an inside forward.

Career
Price began his career with hometown club Swansea Town, and also played in the English Football League for Southend United, Hull City and Bradford City.

He later played in the English non-League system for Welsh club Merthyr Tydfil.

Personal life and death
Price was born in Swansea on 17 November 1931. He died in Swansea in 2021, at the age of 89.

References

External links

1931 births
2021 deaths
Welsh footballers
Swansea City A.F.C. players
Southend United F.C. players
Hull City A.F.C. players
Bradford City A.F.C. players
Merthyr Tydfil F.C. players
English Football League players
Association football forwards
Footballers from Swansea